Grimesland is a town in Pitt County, North Carolina, United States. The population was 441 at the 2010 census.  The town is a part of the Greenville Metropolitan Area located in North Carolina's Inner Banks .

History
Grimesland was named for Gen. Bryan Grimes. The town was laid out on Grimes' plantation.

Grimesland Plantation was added to the National Register of Historic Places in 1971.

Geography
Grimesland is located at  (35.563352, -77.190899).

Demographics

As of the census of 2000, there were 440 people, 174 households, and 116 families residing in the town. The population density was 890.4 people per square mile (346.7/km2). There were 187 housing units at an average density of 378.4 per square mile (147.3/km2). The racial makeup of the town was 62.05% White, 29.09% African American, 0.23% Asian, 7.73% from other races, and 0.91% from two or more races. Hispanic or Latino of any race were 8.86% of the population.

There were 174 households, out of which 27.6% had children under the age of 18 living with them, 47.7% were married couples living together, 14.4% had a female householder with no husband present, and 32 .8% were non-families. 27.0% of all households were made up of individuals, and 13.2% had someone living alone who was 65 years of age or older. The average household size was 2.53 and the average family size was 3.06.

In the town, the population was spread out, with 24.1% under the age of 18, 7.3% from 18 to 24, 29.8% from 25 to 44, 23.6% from 45 to 64, and 15.2% who were 65 years of age or older. The median age was 38 years. For every 100 females, there were 97.3 males. For every 100 females age 18 and over, there were 88.7 males.

The median income for a household in the town was $28,672, and the median income for a family was $36,250. Males had a median income of $27,857 versus $18,750 for females. The per capita income for the town was $14,204. About 12.3% of families and 16.7% of the population were below the poverty line, including 18.4% of those under age 18 and 29.2% of those age 65 or over.

References

External links
 Town of Grimesland Official Website

Towns in Pitt County, North Carolina
Towns in North Carolina
Greenville, North Carolina metropolitan area